Issues is the fourth studio album by American nu metal band Korn. It was released on November 16, 1999, through Immortal Records. The album was promoted throughout 2000 by the band's highly successful Sick and Twisted Tour.

Recording and production

During one of the band's recording sessions, journalist Chris Connelly asked about how the recording was coming along, to which drummer David Silveria responded that it "Sounds like the music is a little more simplified and heavier. Kind of heavier grooves, more than the last couple. So kind of more similar to the beginning, except Jon is a much better singer now, so it's all coming together."

In October 1999, Korn posted "Falling Away from Me" on their website as a free MP3 download, although it was against the advice of its attorneys. A statement on the band's site relates: "We're so psyched about [the new album] that we wanted to give all you guys, the true Korn fans — a gift from us." Also at this time, the band attempted to start an online chain email, by posting the letter online and asking fans to email the letter to 10 other people and to then sign the "I Downloaded the Korn Single for Free" guestbook on the band's site. For each person who signed, Korn donated 25 cents to the charities Childhelp USA and Children of the Night. It raised over $250,000.

The album featured four different covers each designed by Korn fans as part of an MTV contest (the winning cover, submitted in a pizza box, was designed by Alfredo Carlos; another album cover for special limited edition of the album features a cartoonish half-caricature for the band). There was also a fifth cover selected for the limited tour edition of the album.

Release and commercial performance

Issues  went to number 1 on the Billboard 200, preventing both Dr. Dre's 2001 (which sold 516,000) and Celine Dion's All the Way... A Decade of Song from going to number 1. To celebrate the release of Issues, Korn performed the entire album in its running order at Harlem's famed Apollo Theater. On December 22, 1999, a month after the album's release date, Issues was certified 3× platinum by the Recording Industry Association of America (RIAA). As of 2002 According to Nielsen Soundscan, Issues sold at least 3,047,076 copies in the United States. On Billboard year-end chart for the year 2000, Issues was at number 19.

Three songs from Issues were released as singles: "Falling Away from Me", "Make Me Bad", and "Somebody Someone". On December 25, 1999, "Falling Away from Me" went to number 8 on the Bubbling Under Hot 100 Singles chart. "Falling Away from Me" was on that chart for sixteen weeks. "Falling Away from Me" also went to number 7 on the Mainstream Rock Songs chart and number 7 on the Modern Rock Tracks chart. On April 22, 2000, "Make Me Bad" went to number 14 on the Bubbling Under Hot 100 Singles chart. "Make Me Bad" was on that chart for 12 weeks. "Make Me Bad" also went to number 9 on the Mainstream Rock Songs chart and number 7 on the Modern Rock Tracks chart. "Falling Away from Me" went to number 1 on MTV's Total Request Live many times during both November and December 1999.

Critical reception

The album received mixed to positive reviews. According to the band in the booklet that comes with Greatest Hits, Vol. 1 album, they did not want to be part of a popular trend and wanted to do their own thing. The band admits that with Brendan O'Brien working alongside them, they were more focused during recording because he didn't let them just fool around and party, so there was a lot less drinking this time around.

In 2021, it was named one of the 20 best metal albums of 1999 by Metal Hammer magazine.

Track listing
All songs written by Korn.

The song "Dirty" ends at 3:43, with the rest of the song is the static or white noise.
In the advance version, this song ends at 3:46 without the static, followed by an alternative version of "Am I Going Crazy". This version does not contain the reversed channel and has a different mix in the drums and no bass.

All Mixed Up (EP)

All Mixed Up is an EP by Korn released as a bonus disc alongside the album Issues featuring previously unreleased mixes and a previously unreleased song. The EP was made available for purchase separately on February 9, 2001.

Track listing

Personnel
Korn
Jonathan Davis – vocals, bagpipes, additional drums on "Dead", "Trash", "4U", "It's Gonna Go Away", "Wish You Could Be Me" and "Dirty", additional drum programming
Fieldy – bass guitar, additional drum programming
Munky – guitars
Head – guitars
David Silveria – drums

Additional personnel
Jeffy Lube – additional drum programming
Brendan O'Brien – producer, mixing
Nick DiDia – recording
Tobias Miller – additional engineering, editing
Stephen Marcussen – mastering
Andrew Garver – digitally editing
Bryan Cook – assisting
Karl Egsieker – assisting
Ryan Williams – engineering
Jeff Kwatinetz – executive producer
The Firm – executive producers, management

Chart positions

Weekly charts

Year-end charts

Singles

Certifications

References

1999 albums
Albums produced by Brendan O'Brien (record producer)
Epic Records albums
Korn albums
Immortal Records albums